Free solo climbing, or free soloing, is a form of technical rock climbing where the climbers (or free soloists) climb alone without ropes, or other protective equipment, only using their climbing shoes and their climbing chalk. Free soloing is the most dangerous form of climbing, and unlike bouldering, free soloists climb above safe heights, where a fall can be fatal. Though many climbers have free soloed climbing grades they are very comfortable on, only a tiny group free solo regularly, and at grades closer to the limit of their abilities.  

Some climbers' profiles have been increased by free soloing (e.g. Alex Honnold and John Bachar), but some question the ethics of this, and whether the risks they are undertaking should be encouraged and commercially rewarded. "Free solo" was originally a term of climber slang, but after the popularity of the Oscar-winning film Free Solo, Merriam-Webster officially added the word to their English dictionary in September 2019.

Description

Free solo climbing (sometimes referred to as soloing in the UK, or third-classing in the US), is where the climber uses no climbing protection whatsoever (or any form of climbing aid, or even a climbing rope);  they may only use their climbing shoes and their climbing chalk to ascend a single-pitch, or a multi-pitch/big wall climbing route.  Free solo climbing is a form of free climbing, but different from sport climbing and traditional climbing, both of which use climbing protection.  In theory, bouldering is free solo climbing (i.e. it also uses no aid or protection) but is usually not referred to in such a manner, except in the case of highball bouldering, where falls can be serious.  Where a free solo climber carries a rope, just in case, it is sometimes referred to as rope soloing (some only consider it rope soloing where a self-locking device is used for protection).

Many early 20th-century rock climbers who began to free climb (i.e., avoiding any form of aid), were often practicing free solo climbing (or rope soloing), as the effectiveness of their climbing protection (usually a rope around their waist) was minimal.  In the history of rock climbing, the first ascent of Napes Needle by W. P. Haskett Smith in June 1886 – an act that is widely considered to be the start of the sport of rock climbing – was effectively a free solo.  Early leaders of free climbing such as Paul Preuss, were also strongly interested in free solo climbing as being ethically purer. The 1958 ascent by Don Whillans of Goliath, one of the world's first-ever E4 6a routes, was effectively a free solo (with a rope around his waist). By the 1970s, when climbing protection was sufficiently developed to be effective, the discipline of free solo climbing began to stand apart.

Public view

Many climbers praise free soloing, while others have concerns regarding the danger and the message the ascents send to other climbers. Many companies have taken these views into account when working with free soloists. Clif Bar, the nutrition bar company with long ties to climbing, dropped the sponsorship of five climbers in 2014, citing the risks they take and stirring a debate about how much risk should be rewarded.

However, The North Face and Red Bull have promoted free soloists and helped the free soloing community grow. In addition, Alex Honnold, a free soloist who was previously dropped by Clif Bar, was featured in the 2018 documentary Free Solo, which was met with critical acclaim and won the Academy Award for Best Documentary Feature.  The director of Free Solo, Jimmy Chin, talks in the film about the ethics of undertaking the documentary, and the effect that his film team and project could have had on the outcome.

Even in the climbing community, free soloing is controversial.  In 2022, when Climbing did a major feature on free solo climbing, they caveated their series of articles with "This article is not an endorsement of the practice", and emphasized that in their research amongst climbers, it was only practiced by a very small minority, with many telling Climbing: "I have in the past but not anymore".

Practitioners

While many rock climbers have free soloed routes (single-pitch or big wall/multi-pitch), at climbing grades well below their ability, a very small minority have practiced free soloing regularly, and at grades closer to their overall limits.  The most prominent of this smaller group are those who have broken new grade milestones in free solo climbing, and gained a significant profile from their soloing:

 Alex Honnold – the most prolific and well-known free soloist of the 21st century, whose 2017 solo of  Freerider became the iconic film, Free Solo.
 Hansjörg Auer – the prolific big wall and high-altitude big wall free soloist, whose 2007 solo of Fish Route was then the most daring in climbing history.  
 Michael Reardon – prolific free soloist whose 2005 solo of Romantic Warrior won him National Geographic'''s "Adventurer of the Year".
 Alexander Huber – strongest rock climber of the 1990s, who set solo grade milestones in single-pitch (Kommunist), and big wall (Brandler-Hasse Direttissima).
 Alain Robert – the early 1990s and 2000s pioneer of buildering, but who also broke important new free solo grade milestones in the 1990s.
 Wolfgang Güllich – strongest rock climber of the late 1980s, who set single-pitch solo grade milestones (Weed Killer), and did the iconic solo of Separate Reality.
 Catherine Destivelle – strongest female , with Lynn Hill, of the late 1980s, who made iconic female solos in single-pitch (El Matador), and big wall (Bonatti Pillar).
  – prolific free soloist whose 1985 free solo of Revelations in England jumped several grade milestones in free solo climbing.
 Peter Croft – a prolific American free soloist of the 1980s, who pioneered big wall free soloing with The Rostrum and Astroman.
 John Bachar – the first free solo "superstar" and prolific American free soloist of the late 1970s and early 1980s, who pioneered big wall soloing (Nabisco Wall).

In addition to the above, a number of other free solo practitioners are considered historically notable, and include:  Patrick Edlinger, Ron Fawcett, Brad Gobright, Dan Goodwin, Colin Haley, Derek Hersey, Jimmy Jewell, John Long, Dave MacLeod, Dan Osman, Dean Potter, Paul Preuss, Tobin Sorenson and Marc-André Leclerc.

Free soloing is less common amongst female rock climbers, however, as well as Catherine Destivelle, the following female climbers are historically notable free solo practitioners: Steph Davis and Brette Harrington, both of whom who have free soloed single-pitch and big wall routes.

Milestones

Single-pitch routes

Big wall, multi-pitch routes

Practitioner fatalities

A number of notable free solo practitioners have died while free soloing:
 Paul Preuss (3 October 1913; age 27) died in 300m fall from the attempted first ascent of the North Ridge of the Mandlkogel (in the Gosaukamm) as a free solo.
 Jimmy Jewell died (31 October 1987; age 34) free soloing the easy route Poor Man's Peuterey (graded UK-Severe) at Tremadog, North Wales taking a short-cut.
 Derek Hersey died (28 May 1993; age 36) while free soloing the Steck-Salathé Route on Sentinel Rock in Yosemite.
 Dwight Bishop fell (19 July 2004; age 49) while climbing alone and unroped along the Grand Traverse route on Grand Teton peak in Wyoming.
 John Bachar died (5 July 2009; age 52) in a free solo accident at Dike Wall near Mammoth Lakes, California.
 Michael J. Ybarra died (July 2012; age 45) climbing solo on The Matterhorn Peak in California's Sierra Nevada Mountains.Climbing notes that a number of prominent free solo practitioners died in related or other extreme sports, including: Dan Osman (died at age 35 while rope jumping at Yosemite), Michael Reardon (died age 42 while rock climbing sea cliffs when he was carried out to sea by a rogue wave), Dean Potter (died age 43 while wingsuit flying when he crashed at Yosemite), Brad Gobright (died age 31 while abseiling at Potrero Chico), and Hansjorg Auer (died age 35 in an avalanche at Howse Peak).

Related genres
 
 Buildering: Some free soloists scale buildings, such as Alain Robert ("The French Spider-Man"), and Dan Goodwin ("Skyscraperman"), who have scaled dozens of skyscrapers around the world—a sport known as buildering—without any safety equipment.
 Deep-water soloing (DWS), is a subtype of free solo climbing performed on rock faces overhanging water where in the case of a fall, the climber lands in the water. Noted DWS climbers include Chris Sharma.
 FreeBASEing, is a subtype of free solo climbing performed on long multi-pitch big wall routes with a BASE jumping parachute as the sole means of protection, where a falling climber opens their parachute to arrest their fall.  FreeBASEing was pioneered by Dean Potter.
 Highball bouldering, is where the boulder exceeds  in height, and therefore any fall, even where bouldering mats are used, presents a risk of serious injury.  Where highball bouldering ends and free soloing begins is a source of debate amongst climbers.

See also

Parkour
Rope soloing

References

Further reading
 The High Lonesome: Epic Solo Climbing Stories, John Long. 
 Ament, Pat (2001). A History of Free Climbing in AmericaExternal links
VIDEO: Catherine Destivelle Free Soloing Devils Tower, Wyoming, Rock & Ice'' (February 2018)

Types of climbing
Free solo climbing